Wailua River State Park and the Wailua Complex of Heiaus, which it includes, are located on the eastern side of the Hawaiian island of Kauai. The park consists primarily of the Wailua River valley, which is the only navigable river in Hawaii. Visitors to this park can kayak, take riverboat cruises and explore the rainforest. Even motorboats and water skiing are permissible on the river.

Wailua Complex of Heiaus
The Wailua Complex, a National Historic Landmark, was once the center of chiefly power on the island. It contains the remains of several important structures: places of worship (heiau), places of refuge (puuhonua), and sites related to royal births. The most important sites are:

Hikinaakalā (Rising of the Sun) Heiau, which includes the Hauola place of refuge (puuhonua) and the Kii Pōhaku ancient petroglyphs, at the mouth of the river adjacent to Lydgate State Park
Malae, also known as Malaea or Makaukiu or Mana Heiau, a huge, rectangular luakini heiau almost 400 feet long on the south side of the river just above Highway 56
Holoholokū Heiau, also known as Kalaeokamanu, adjacent to the pōhaku hoohānau (birthing stone) and pōhaku piko (navel/umbilical stone), where women of high rank would give birth and bury their afterbirth and umbilical cords
Poliahu (also spelled Poliahu) Heiau, a large luakini heiau high on the narrow ridge between Ōpaekaa Stream and Wailua River
Bellstone (on the same ridge), used to announce important events, such as royal births

Of these, only Holoholokū has been largely restored.

Heiau images

History
Wailua was the land of the ali'i (kings) and was one of the largest ahupuaa (subdivisions) on Kauai. It is said that King Kaumuali'i's favorite place to live was in Wailua. There are Hawaiian heiaus starting from the mouth of the river all the way to the summit of Mt.Waialeale. The huaka'i po (Ghost Warriors) are said to walk ancient trails along the river at night up to Mount Waiʻaleʻale. Wailua has many legends about it and was once home to many Hawaiians.

See also 
List of Hawaiian state parks
Smith Family Garden Luau

References

Heiau
State parks of Hawaii
Properties of religious function on the National Register of Historic Places in Hawaii
National Historic Landmarks in Hawaii
Protected areas of Kauai
Historic districts on the National Register of Historic Places in Hawaii
National Register of Historic Places in Kauai County, Hawaii